The Arizona Diamondbacks are a Major League Baseball (MLB) franchise based in Phoenix, Arizona. They play in the National League West division. The first game of the new baseball season for a team is played on Opening Day, and being named the Opening Day starter is an honor, which is often given to the player who is expected to lead the pitching staff that season, though there are various strategic reasons why a team's best pitcher might not start on Opening Day. The Diamondbacks have used 10 different Opening Day starting pitchers in their 21 seasons. The 10 starters have a combined Opening Day record of eight wins, seven losses (8–7), and six no decisions. No decisions are only awarded to the starting pitcher if the game is won or lost after the starting pitcher has left the game.

Randy Johnson holds the Diamondbacks' record for most Opening Day starts with six, and has an Opening Day record of 3–2. Brandon Webb started four Opening Days, and Ian Kennedy has been the Opening Day starter thrice. Andy Benes, Javier Vázquez, Dan Haren, and Wade Miley have started one Opening Day each. Kennedy has the best winning percentage as the Opening Day starting pitcher with a record of 2–0. Benes, Vázquez, and Miley are tied for the worst Opening Day record, at 0–1. Webb is Arizona's only pitcher with multiple no-decisions on Opening Day (three), and Johnson is the only pitcher to have won three or more opening games.

Overall, the Diamondbacks have a record of 8–7 at home on Opening Day, compared to a 4–2 record at away games.

Key

Pitchers

References 

Lists of Major League Baseball Opening Day starting pitchers
Opening Day starting pitchers